The White Gloves (Persian: Dastkeshe sefid) is a 1951 Iranian comedy film directed by Parviz Khatibi.

Cast
 Rogheyeh Chehreh-Azad
 Hamid Ghanbari as Hamid

References

Bibliography 
 Mohammad Ali Issari. Cinema in Iran, 1900-1979. Scarecrow Press, 1989.

External links 
 

1951 films
Iranian comedy films
1950s Persian-language films
1951 comedy films
Iranian black-and-white films